Chacarilla Municipality is the third municipal section of the Gualberto Villarroel Province in the  La Paz Department, Bolivia. Its seat is Chacarilla. It had 23 inhabitants in 2001.

Subdivision 
The municipality is divided into three cantons:
 Chacarilla Canton - 394 inhabitants (2001) 
 Puerto Aroma Canton - 205 inhabitants
 Puerto Aroma
 Rosa Pata Canton - 964 inhabitants

References 

 Instituto Nacional de Estadistica de Bolivia

Municipalities of La Paz Department (Bolivia)